The 2018 Toyota Grand Prix of Long Beach was the third round of the 2018 IndyCar Series and the 44th annual running of the Toyota Grand Prix of Long Beach. The race was contested over 85 laps on a temporary street circuit in Long Beach, California on April 15, 2018. Alexander Rossi won both the pole and the race.

Report

Race
Rossi maintained the lead position on the start. Will Power, who had qualified alongside Rossi on the front row, also held his position in second. Behind the leaders, Graham Rahal made contact with Simon Pagenaud, forcing the latter into the wall and out of the race. Rossi's lead remained at about 3.5 seconds from lap seven to lap 25, when he made his first pit stop. He would regain the lead after the other drivers made their own stops, holding it for most of the rest of the race. Rossi's victory moved him to the lead in the Drivers' Championship points standings, 23 points ahead of Josef Newgarden, who finished seventh in the race.

Results

Qualifying

Race

Notes:
 Points include 1 point for leading at least 1 lap during a race, an additional 2 points for leading the most race laps, and 1 point for Pole Position.

Championship standings after the race

Drivers' Championship standings

Manufacturer standings

 Note: Only the top five positions are included.

References

Grand Prix of Long Beach
Toyota Grand Prix of Long Beach

Toyota Grand Prix of Long Beach
Toyota Grand Prix of Long Beach